James Thomas Schuerman (born April 5, 1957) is an American prelate of the Roman Catholic Church who has been serving as auxiliary bishop of the Archdiocese of Milwaukee in Wisconsin since 2017.

Biography

Early life 
Born in Burlington, Wisconsin, to Robert and Elizabeth Schuerman, James Schuerman grew up in Lyons, Wisconsin. He was a member of St. Joseph Parish, and attended St. Joseph's Grade School, Burlington Junior High School, and Burlington High School. Schuerman has four siblings: Virginia Kalaveshi, Robert Schuerman, Jr., Theresa Schuerman  and David Schuerman.

Schuerman attended Saint Francis de Sales Seminary College in Milwaukee from 1976 to 1980, earning a bachelor's degree.  He spent one more year at St. Francis de Sales before being sent to the University of Innsbruck in Innsbruck Austria.  He earned his Master of Theology degree at the university.

Priesthood 
On May 17, 1986, Schuerman was ordained to the priesthood. His first assignment after ordination was as associate pastor at St. Anthony Parish in Milwaukee, remaining there until 1992.  Schuerman was then selected for missionary service at the archdiocesan sister parish, La Sagrada Familia, in the Dominican Republic, working there from 1992 to 1996.

In August 1996, Schuerman enrolled in a graduate program at Catholic Theological Union in Chicago for returning missionaries, earning a Doctor of Ministry degree in spirituality.  In 1997, he joined the faculty of Saint Francis de Sales Seminary as spiritual director and faculty member..  In 2009, Schuerman left Saint Francis to  become administrator of St. Andrew Parish in Delavan, Wisconsin and then pastor at St. Andrew Parish in 2010.  From 2011 to 2012, he also served as pastor of St. Patrick Parish in Elkhorn, Wisconsin.  In 2012, Schuerman became pastor of St. Francis de Sales Parish in Lake Geneva, Wisconsin, and administrator of Holy Cross Parish in Bristol, Wisconsin. He continued his role in priest formation, serving as adjunct spiritual director for Saint Francis de Sales Seminary.

Schuerman speaks German and is fluent in Spanish.  He received the archdiocesan Vatican II Award for Service to the Priesthood in 2012.

Auxiliary Bishop of Milwaukee
Pope Francis appointed Schuerman as an auxiliary bishop for the Archdiocese of Milwaukee on January 25, 2017. On March 17, 2017, Schuerman was consecrated as a bishop.

See also

 Catholic Church hierarchy
 Catholic Church in the United States
 Historical list of the Catholic bishops of the United States
 List of Catholic bishops of the United States
 Lists of patriarchs, archbishops, and bishops

References

External links

  Roman Catholic Archdiocese of Milwaukee Official Site

1957 births
Living people
People from Burlington, Wisconsin
Religious leaders from Milwaukee
Roman Catholic Archdiocese of Milwaukee
Catholics from Wisconsin
21st-century Roman Catholic bishops in the United States
Bishops appointed by Pope Francis